Twisted Triggers is a 1926 American silent Western film directed by Richard Thorpe and starring Hal Taliaferro, Jean Arthur and William Bertram.

Cast
 Hal Taliaferro as Wally Weston 
 Jean Arthur as Ruth Regan
 Al Richmond as Norris
 Art Winkler as Angel-Face
 J.P. Lockney as Hiram Weston
 William Bertram as Jim Regan
 Harry Belmour as Cook
 Lawrence Underwood as Sheriff

References

Bibliography
 Rainey, Buck. Sweethearts of the Sage: Biographies and Filmographies of 258 actresses appearing in Western movies. McFarland & Company, 1992.

External links
 

1926 films
1926 Western (genre) films
American black-and-white films
1920s English-language films
Films directed by Richard Thorpe
Associated Exhibitors films
Silent American Western (genre) films
1920s American films
Silent adventure films